State Road 25 is a highway in the U. S. state of Indiana. Although it is designated a north–south road, in practice it travels generally northeast from its southern terminus at State Road 32 (south of Waynetown and north of Shades State Park) to its northern terminus at State Road 15 in Warsaw.

Route description

Waynetown to Lafayette 
SR 25 heads north from its southern terminus towards Waynetown. In Waynetown SR 25 is concurrence with U.S. Route 136. Then SR 25 heads north towards Wingate passing over Interstate 74. In Wingate SR 25, has an intersection with the southern terminus of State Road 55. After Wingate SR 25 heads north toward West Point, where SR 25 turns east then northeast toward Lafayette. SR 25 terminates at the intersection with U.S. Route 231, south of West Lafayette. At this point and as of September 2013 the route is discontinuous due to the transfer of several urban road segments to the city of Lafayette. Formerly the route followed Teal Road and Sagamore Parkway through the south and east sides of Lafayette. SR 25 resumes at the interchange with I-65 (exit 175 on I-65) on the northeast side of town.

Lafayette to Logansport 
After I-65, SR 25 heads northeast out of Lafayette and, immediately after a roundabout, curves to the right and becomes a 4-lane limited access highway. It then heads towards Delphi, bypassing it on the south side, having interchanges with U.S. Route 421, State Road 18, State Road 39 and the western terminus of State Road 218. SR 25 then heads northeast towards Logansport, going past the communities of Rockfield, Burrows, and Clymers. SR 25 intersects with passing U.S. Route 24, U.S. Route 35, and State Road 29 near Logansport. SR 25 then heads into downtown Logansport after exiting off the Hoosier Heartland Highway onto Burlington Ave. 

State Route 25 from Lafayette to Logansport is part of the National Highway System, a network of routes deemed most important for the nation's economy, mobility and defense.

Logansport to Warsaw 
In Logansport SR 25 has one way pairs with northbound on Market Street and southbound on Broadway. At Sixth Street SR 25 turns north on to Sixth Street. SR 25 leaves Logansport on north side of town, heading north-northeast toward Rochester. On the south side of Rochester SR 25 has an interchange with U.S. Route 31. Through Rochester SR 25 is concurrent with State Road 14. SR 25 leaves town on the north side, heading north towards Warsaw. West of Mentone SR 25 turn due east. SR 25 passes through Mentone having an intersection with State Road 19. East of Mentone SR 25 heads east and then northeast towards its northern terminus in Warsaw at State Road 15.

History 

Between 1917 and 1926 SR 25 went from Michigan City to the Ohio State Line, east of Angola, the route is now U.S. Route 20.

Then in 1926, SR 25 was changed to a route from Logansport to Rochester. In 1930, the route went from Lafayette to Rochester. Then in 1932, SR 25 went from SR 32 to Warsaw.

Originally SR 25 passed through Lafayette, entering from the south on 4th Street, continuing on 3rd and 4th Streets where they are one-way streets, to Union and Salem Streets (also one-ways), to 14th Street, then one block on Greenbush Street, then to 15th Street which became Schuyler Avenue. With the building of Sagamore Parkway and the rerouting of US 52 onto it, SR 25 was rerouted to Teal Road, to Sagamore Parkway/US 52, to Schuyler Avenue. This routing is still commonly seen on maps; in the 1990s this routing was further modified to route using SR 38 and Interstate 65.

In 2012, INDOT officially dropped the routing of SR 25, SR 26, and a few other routes inside the city limits of Lafayette and West Lafayette, as previously done with Indianapolis's former numerical routes inside the Interstate 465 beltline.  As a result, the routes are now technically discontinuous. On September 13, 2013, the US 231 bypass in West Lafayette was given over to traffic. At the same time both SR 25 and SR 26 ceased to be signed on their respective alignments between US 231 and Interstate 65.

Major intersections

References

External links

025
Transportation in Fulton County, Indiana
Transportation in Kosciusko County, Indiana
Transportation in Montgomery County, Indiana
Transportation in Carroll County, Indiana
Transportation in Cass County, Indiana
Transportation in Tippecanoe County, Indiana